High Salvington is a neighbourhood of Worthing, in the borough of Worthing in West Sussex, England.

History

Pre-history
At the top of West Hill in High Salvington are remains of Neolithic huts, possibly used by Neolithic flint miners.  High Salvington may have one of only a few flint mines in Britain, however since the fields containing the possible mines were disturbed by plough use this cannot be made definite.

Development and preservation of the South Downs 
At High Salvington after 1923, despite the protests of preservationists, many large detached houses of various styles spread almost to the top of Salvington Hill. Housing in the locality reaches higher up the South Downs than anywhere else in Worthing, reaching the 120 metre contour.   Many old trees and banks were retained, especially in Salvington Hill.

Unlike Salvington to the south, High Salvington was part of the parish of Durrington until it became part of the borough of Worthing in 1929.

Geography
High Salvington is on the sea-facing upper slopes of the South Downs north of Salvington and Worthing, and is separated from Findon Valley by The Gallops, a public parkland.

Landmarks
The main landmark is High Salvington windmill, which has been restored to a working condition over the last 30 years. The windmill is open every first and third Sunday afternoon during the months April to September, for the public to view.

Amenities

Commercial
The neighbourhood has a shop, The Village Shop which includes a bakery, post office and general store.

Religious
St Peter's Church, Anglican, was built in 1928 is largely made of corrugated iron and glass.
St Michael's Catholic Church, which moved to its present location from Durrington in 1966.

Politics
Together with Findon Valley, High Salvington is part of the Cissbury electoral division of West Sussex.

Notable inhabitants
The actress Nancy Price lived in a cottage, 'Arcana', in Heather Lane.

References

External links

Suburbs of Worthing